Acraea dondoensis, the Dondo acraea, is a butterfly in the family Nymphalidae. It is found in Mozambique.

Biology
Adults are on wing year round.

Taxonomy
Subspecies of Acraea nohara

References

Butterflies described in 1934
dondoensis
Endemic fauna of Mozambique
Butterflies of Africa